Williston is a town in Chittenden County, Vermont, United States. Originally rural and laid out with many farms, in recent decades it has developed into a thriving suburb of Burlington, the largest city in the state of Vermont. As of the 2020 census, the population of Williston was 10,103, an increase of over 1,000 people since the 2010 census. Williston is one of the fastest-growing towns in Vermont, and while becoming more populated, it has also developed as a major retail center for the Burlington area as well as much of central and northern Vermont. The town contains the village of Williston, which is unincorporated.

History

The town was chartered in the New Hampshire Grants in 1763 as a grant from Governor Benning Wentworth of the colony of New Hampshire. It was named for Samuel Willis, a New York merchant who was one of the original 65 grantees, though he never visited the town that was named in his honor.

A private, boarding high school, Pine Ridge, was founded in 1968 to serve learning-disabled students. It closed in June 2009.

The town is notable for its fine and well preserved central collection of brick nineteenth century civic and religious buildings including the "old Brick Church" of 1832, considered one of Vermont's finest country Gothic churches; the former Universalist Church, now the Town Hall, of 1860; the former Methodist Church of 1848, now the Town Annex; former Town Hall of approximately 1840. Also is the regal Federated Church of 1867, formerly the Methodist Episcopal Church, designed by noted Boston architect John Stevens. On the western side of the town, bordering South Burlington, is Vermont's largest mercantile development with numerous "big box" stores and other commercial activities, making it a destination from all over the region.

The town was also the home of several generations of the Chittenden family, for whom the surrounding county, Vermont's most populous, is named. A number of beautiful original Chittenden family homes still stand in the town. Thomas Chittenden, the President of the Vermont Republic, and first governor of the state had his home in Williston and is buried in the central cemetery, with a prominent memorial.

Events
During the night of July 7, 1984, an Amtrak train with 287 people aboard hit a landslide and derailed, killing five people and injuring about two hundred. Although the accident triggered one of Vermont's most intensive emergency responses, the final victims were not rescued until the end of the day.

Geography
Williston is in central Chittenden County, bordered on the north by the Winooski River. The city of South Burlington is to the west.

Brooks
Allen Brook drains the center of the town. It begins and flows from Mud Pond north to the village of Williston, and then in a northwesterly direction where it meets the Winooski River.

Muddy Brook flows on the western edge of Williston and marks the border between Williston and South Burlington.

Demographics

As of the census of 2010, there were 8,698 people, 2,921 households, and 2,141 families residing in the town. The population density was 252.1 people per square mile (97.4/km2). There were 3,036 housing units at an average density of 100.1 per square mile (38.6/km2). The racial makeup of the town was 95.6% White, 1.0% African American, 0.2% Native American, 2.0% Asian, 0.01% Pacific Islander, 0.10% from other races, and 1.1% from two or more races. Hispanic or Latino of any race were 1.5% of the population.

There were 2,921 households, out of which 36.8% had children under the age of 18 living with them, 65.1% were married couples living together, 5.3% had a female householder with no husband present, and 26.7% were non-families. 20.4% of all households were made up of individuals, and 7.9% had someone living alone who was 65 years of age or older. The average household size was 2.59 and the average family size was 3.02.

In the town, the population was spread out, with 27.5% under the age of 18, 4.1% from 18 to 24, 32.0% from 25 to 44, 24.6% from 45 to 64, and 11.7% who were 65 years of age or older. The median age was 39 years. For every 100 females, there were 95.8 males. For every 100 females age 18 and over, there were 91.6 males.

The median income for a household in the town was $61,467, and the median income for a family was $69,762. Males had a median income of $49,048, versus $31,740 for females. The per capita income for the town was $29,757. About 0.8% of families and 1.5% of the population were below the poverty line, including 0.8% of those under age 18 and 4.9% of those age 65 or over.

Economy
One measure of economic activity is retail sales. Williston led the state in 2007 with US$434.8 million. The part of town known as Taft Corners has a number of big-box stores, including Walmart, Home Depot, Bed Bath and Beyond, Petsmart, Staples, Old Navy, and Best Buy, as well as chain restaurants not seen elsewhere in Vermont such as Chili's, Texas Roadhouse, Longhorn Steakhouse, and Ninety-Nine. Additionally, U.S. Immigration and Customs Enforcement operates a large law enforcement center in the town.

Education

The town has two schools: Allen Brook School, Pre-K–2, and Williston Central School, 3–8.

The Williston school district is part of the Champlain Valley School District. It therefore sends its students of high school age to Champlain Valley Union High School, which it supports through taxation. Pine Ridge School, a boarding and day school which served students with learning disabilities and behavioral issues, was located in Williston from its founding in 1968 through its closure in 2009.

Infrastructure

Transportation
Bus service is provided by Chittenden County Transportation Authority. This transportation brings residents and workers to South Burlington and Burlington, the central locations of the bus system.

Major routes
Interstate 89 passes through town from east to west, though it is signed north-south. There is an interchange just south of downtown.

U.S. Route 2, also known as Williston Road, passes through town from east to west. Williston's historic village is located along U.S. 2 in the center of town.

Vermont Route 2A provides a north-south route through town, connecting it to Hinesburg and Essex Junction. Much of the town's retail development, including nearly all of its big-box stores, is located along Route 2A, which runs through the western part of Williston and intersects I-89 and U.S. Route 2.

Notable people 

 Edwin Atwater, Canadian businessperson and politician
 James Edmund Burke, mayor of Burlington, Vermont
 Lucius E. Chittenden, attorney and author who served as Register of the U.S. Treasury during the American Civil War
 Martin Chittenden, U.S. congressman and governor of Vermont
 Thomas Chittenden, founder of the Republic of Vermont and first governor of Vermont
 Ben Cohen, entrepreneur and co-founder of Ben & Jerry's
 Bart Farley, professional soccer player and coach
 Jerry Greenfield, entrepreneur and co-founder of Ben & Jerry's
 Raul Hilberg, Austrian-born historian and leading scholar on the Holocaust
 Virginia V. Lyons, member of the Vermont Senate
 Ross Miner, figure skater and skating coach
 Haviland Smith, retired CIA officer and former station chief
 Russell S. Taft, chief justice of the Vermont Supreme Court

See also
 Vermont locations by per capita income

References

External links

 Town of Williston official website

 
Towns in Vermont
Burlington, Vermont metropolitan area
Towns in Chittenden County, Vermont